Cruizer may refer to

Cruizer-class brig-sloop, a Royal Navy ship class in service 1797–1826
Cruizer-class sloop, a Royal Navy ship class in service 1852–1912
HMS Cruizer, eleven ships of the Royal Navy that have borne the name Cruizer or Cruiser

See also
Cruiser